Qaleh Now-ye Anqolabi (also Romanized as Qal’eh Now-ye Ānqolābī; also known as Qal‘eh Now-ye Ra’īsī, Qal‘eh Now-e Ra’īsī, and Qal’eh Now) is a village in Rezqabad Rural District, in the Central District of Esfarayen County, North Khorasan Province, Iran. At the 2006 census, its population was 142, in 40 families.

References 

Populated places in Esfarayen County